Zozulya ("cuckoo bird"), also spelled Zozulia and Zozula, is a Ukrainian surname. Notable people with the surname include:

 Anna Zozulia (born 1980), Ukrainian-Belgian chess player
 Fyodor Zozulya (1907–1964), Soviet admiral
 Greta Zozula, American cinematographer
 Oleksandr Zozulya (born 1996), Ukrainian footballer
 Roman Zozulya (footballer) (born 1989), Ukrainian footballer
 Roman Zozulya (gymnast) (born 1979), Ukrainian gymnast
 Vera Zozulya (born 1956), Soviet/Latvian luger
 Vira Zozulya (born 1970), Ukrainian race walker

See also

External links
  Origin of surname Zozulya. ufology.ru.
  Origin of surnames of the Horodyshche Raion residents. horodysche.info. 10 March 2013

Ukrainian-language surnames
Surnames of Ukrainian origin